MetaMatrix was a U.S.-based technology company that created an enterprise information integration (EII) software product to deliver data services for service-oriented architectures. Founded in 1998 as Quadrian, MetaMatrix has development offices in St. Louis and Boston, and business offices in NY, Baltimore, Washington, DC, Boston, and London.

In June 2007, MetaMatrix was acquired by Red Hat for integration within service-oriented architecture environments served by Red Hat's JBoss middleware products.

Products

MetaMatrix offered products providing data services for service-oriented architectures (SOAs).
 
 MetaMatrix Enterprise
 MetaMatrix Dimension
 MetaMatrix Query

External links
 Official site (now redirects to the Red Hat MetaMatrix section.
 MetaMatrix Dev Central developer community
 Red Hat to acquire MetaMatrix
 Red Hat acquisition completed (broken link)
 Open Source project for the Integration Server
 Open Source project for the Designer Tool
 Open Source project that subsumes the MetaMatrix Metadata Repository

Companies based in Missouri
Companies established in 1998
Economy of St. Louis
Red Hat
Software companies based in Missouri
Defunct software companies of the United States
1998 establishments in the United States
1998 establishments in Missouri
Software companies established in 1998